Esclusham White Stars was a Welsh football club based in Rhostyllen, Wales.

History

Formed sometime around 1900 Esclusham White Stars won the Welsh Amateur Cup in 1905 and 1908. Esclusham also achieved some league success, they won the Wrexham District League in 1908, as well as being Runners Up in 1906, and having two Third place finishes in 1904 and 1905. Esclusham also entered the Welsh Cup, their best showing being the Second Round in 1912. They are assumed to have folded around 1930, as no record exists of the club after 1929.

Seasons

Cup History

References

Defunct football clubs in Wales
Sport in Wrexham
Sport in Wrexham County Borough
Football clubs in Wrexham